Anoplocnemis is a genus of sap-sucking insects in the family Coreidae.

References

Mictini
Coreidae genera